The Master of San Verecondo (active first half of 15th century) was an anonymous painter active in the towns of Fabriano and Gualdo Tadino in the Marche.

He painted in the church of San Francesco in Gualdo Tadino and a fragment of a crucifixion for the Convent of San Domenico in Fabriano. Works of his are also on display in the Pinacoteca Vaticana of Rome and the Collezione Salini of Asciano. The Pinacoteca of Fabriano has a gilded triptych depicting a Madonna and Child with Saints Augustine and San Verecondo.

References

15th-century Italian painters
San Verecondo, Master of the